Maile Flanagan is an American television, film, and voice actress known for her work in cartoons, anime and video games. Some of her prominent roles include Naruto Uzumaki in the English dub of Naruto, Piggley Winks in Jakers! The Adventures of Piggley Winks and Terry Perry in Lab Rats. She has made guest appearances in several television series such as ER, Shameless, Bad Teacher, The Office, Grey's Anatomy and Not Dead Yet as Tina. 

Her live action work include appearances in Phone Booth (2002), The Number 23 (2007), Evan Almighty (2007), 500 Days of Summer (2009) and Transformers: Dark of the Moon (2011).

She has numerous theater credits including working with writer/director Justin Tanner in his plays Oklahomo!, Wife Swappers, Pot Mom, and Zombie Attack!

Early life and education 
Flanagan was born in Honolulu, Hawaii. Her father worked for the U.S. military intelligence. In 1969, her family was stationed in Bangkok, Thailand and when she was ten, they moved to Germany.

She graduated from a Department of Defense (DOD) school Munich America High School (MAHS) in 1983. In 1987, Flanagan graduated from Boston College with a degree in political science concentrating in history and mathematics.

Career 
After a brief stint in Washington, D.C., Flanagan moved to Minneapolis and worked in theater roles and did stand-up comedy. She was in the comedy troupe Every Mother's Nightmare with Wayne Wilderson, Tom McCarthy and Nancy Walls. In 1996, she moved to Los Angeles with the stage production of The Bad Seed, which won an LA Weekly Theater Award for Best Comedy Ensemble.

Flanagan's first major voice role in animation was as the Piggley Winks in Jakers! The Adventures of Piggley Winks for which she was  nominated for an Annie Award in 2005, the same year she was cast as the title character, Naruto Uzumaki in the English dub version of Naruto, she has since consistently voiced the kid, teen and adult incarnations of Naruto in all of its properties including numerous spin-offs and video game adaptations for over 15 years. She also earned an Emmy Award for Outstanding Performer in an Animated Program for her performance in Jakers! The Adventures of Piggley Winks in 2006.

In 2009, Flanagan provided the voice of Mother Aardvark in the third installment of Ice Age film series. Also in 2009, she appeared in Marc Webb's romantic comedy drama 500 Days of Summer. The following year, she lent her voice to Orangu-Tammy in the animated film Kung-Fu Magoo.

From 2012, Flanagan starred as Terry Perry, principal of the Mission Creek High School in the Disney XD live-action comedy series Lab Rats, she was in the show for four seasons until it ended in 2016. She reprised the role again in the 2016 spinoff of the series called Lab Rats: Elite Force. She also had a recurring role as Connie in the third and fourth season of the Showtime comedy-drama TV series Shameless.

Personal life 
Flanagan is a lesbian. In 2008, she married Lesa Hammett.

Filmography

Live-action roles

Television

Film

Voice roles

Television

Film

Video games

Awards and nominations

References

External links 

 
 
 
 Interview with AfterEllen.com

Living people
Actresses from Honolulu
American expatriates in Germany
American expatriates in Thailand
American film actresses
American lesbian actresses
American stage actresses
American television actresses
American voice actresses
Daytime Emmy Award winners
LGBT people from Hawaii
Year of birth missing (living people)
20th-century American actresses
21st-century American actresses